Policy is the first solo studio album by Martha Davis, who is better known as the lead singer for the band The Motels. Martha broke up with her band in February 1987, declaring that she was going solo, and by November, she had released her first solo album.

Track listing
"Tell It to the Moon" (Diane Warren) – 4:16
"Just Like You" (Martha Davis, John Dexter) – 4:11
"Heaven Outside My Door" (Davis) – 4:03
"Don't Tell Me the Time" (Davis) – 3:34
"Rebecca" (Davis) – 3:22
"What Money Might Buy" (Davis) – 3:32
"Don't Ask Out Loud" (Davis, Roger Bruno, Ellen Schwartz) – 4:24
"The Hardest Part of a Broken Heart" (Davis) – 4:03
"Lust" (Davis, David Batteau) – 3:59
"My Promise" (Davis, Batteau, Bruce Gaitsch) – 3:52
"Bridge of Sighs" (Davis, Sue Shifrin) – 3:52

Singles
"Don't Tell Me the Time" (Capitol Records #44057) Released: Nov 1987 Charts: Australia #8 / US #80
"Tell It to the Moon" (Capitol Records #44114) Released: Jan 1988 Charts: Australia #65
"Just Like You" (Capitol Records #79188) Released: Mar 1988 Charts: US-FM #15
"Don't Ask Out Loud" (Capitol Records #79188) Released: Mar 1988 Charts: Australia #90
"What Money Might Buy" (Capitol Records AU:#CP 2157) Released: Apr 1988 (Australia only)

Personnel
Credits are adapted from the Policy CD liner notes.

 Martha Davis – vocals (1–10), backing vocals (9), arranger
 Richie Zito – guitars (1–7, 11), additional keyboards (2–3, 8–9), bongos (4), lead guitar (9), arranger
 Steve Farris – guitar solo (1)
 Charlie Sexton – guitar solo (6)
 Bruce Gaitsch – rhythm guitar (9), synthesizers (10), guitars (10)
 Gary Chang – synthesizers (1–10, 11), piano solo (8), arranger
 Clarence Clemons – saxophone (2)
 Kenny G – saxophone (7, 11)
 Randy Jackson – bass (1–2, 4, 6–9, 11)
 Michael Goodroe – bass (3, 5, 10)
 Michael Baird – drums (1–2, 4–6, 11)
 Vinnie Colaiuta – drums (3, 7–9)
 Paulinho da Costa – percussion (3, 7, 9)

 Gary Falcone – backing vocals (1, 4, 11)
 Kipp Lennon – backing vocals (1–2, 4, 11)
 Carmen Twillie – backing vocals (1, 7–8), choir (3)
 Joe Pizzulo – backing vocals (1–2, 4, 11), choir (3), vocal arrangements (3)
 James Gilstrap – choir (3)
 Phillip Ingram – choir (3)
 Marlena Jeter – choir (3), backing vocals (7, 9)
 Darryl Phinnessee – choir (3)
 Phyllis St. James – choir (3), backing vocals (7)
 Julia Waters Tillman – choir (3), backing vocals (8)
 Maxine Waters – choir (3), backing vocals (8)
 Oren Waters – choir (3)
 The Gang Bang Gang Ltd. – backing vocals (6)
 David Batteau – backing vocals (9)
 Timothy B. Schmit – backing vocals (10)

Production
 Richie Zito – producer
 Phil Kaffel – engineer
 David Leonard – mixing
 Todd Yvega – Synclavier programming
 Mark Binder – Synclavier programming
 Lori Fumar – second engineer
 Bernard Frings – second engineer
 Stephen Marcussen – mastering
 Katy Parks – production coordination
 Rich Modica – guitar tech
 Phillip Dixon – photography
 Norman Moore – art direction, design

Charts

References

1987 debut albums
Martha Davis (rock singer) albums
Albums produced by Richie Zito
Capitol Records albums